Clémencey is a former commune in the Côte-d'Or department in eastern France. It is located 17 km south west of Dijon. On 1 January 2019, it was merged into the new commune Valforêt.

Population

See also
Communes of the Côte-d'Or department

References

Former communes of Côte-d'Or
Populated places disestablished in 2019